Mister Mxyzptlk, sometimes called Mxy, is a character who appears in American comic books published by DC Comics. He is usually presented as a trickster in the classical mythological sense. Mxyzptlk possesses reality-warping powers with which he enjoys tormenting Superman or making life difficult. His portrayal has varied, with him being an outright supervillain in some media, and an antihero in others.

Mr. Mxyzptlk was created to appear in Superman #30 (September / October 1944), in the story "The Mysterious Mr. Mxyztplk" (the original spelling), by writer Jerry Siegel and artist Ira Yarborough. Due to publishing lag time, the character saw print first in the Superman daily comic strip by writer Whitney Ellsworth and artist Wayne Boring.

In most of Mxyzptlk's appearances in DC Comics, he can be stopped only by tricking him into saying or spelling his own name backwards, which will return him to his home in the fifth dimension and keep him there for a minimum of 90 days. This limitation of the character was modified in the 1986 Crisis on Infinite Earths reboot, upon which Mxyzptlk changes his condition to leave to a new requirement each story, such as having Superman succeed in getting him to paint his own face blue.

Mxyzptlk has appeared in various television adaptations of Superman. He appeared in the 1993 television series Lois & Clark: The New Adventures of Superman, portrayed by Howie Mandel. Mxyzptlk also appeared in the 2001 television series Smallville played by Trent Ford. Mxyzptlk appeared in the Arrowverse television series Supergirl played by Peter Gadiot in the second season and by Thomas Lennon in the fifth and sixth seasons, while the late comedian Gilbert Gottfried voiced the character in several voice-acting-related projects.

Fictional character biography

Golden Age

Mister Mxyztplk (the original spelling) was introduced in the Golden Age as an imp from the "fifth dimension". Not being bound by physical laws, he can do things that seem to be magical. In his first appearance, Mxyztplk wreaks havoc across Metropolis by using his powers to pull all manner of pranks, first pretending he got hit by a truck and killed, then increasing his weight when the ambulance gets there and waking up to shock them. What is more, he destroys Superman's worldview of himself. Mxyztplk jumps out a window, fooling Superman into thinking Mxyztplk is committing suicide. When he appears unharmed, an astonished Superman exclaims, "I-I thought I was the only man who could fly!!". He gives the Mayor the voice of a donkey, then blows papers over the town. Mxyztplk soon tells Superman that he is a jester in his home dimension, explaining why he uses his powers to play practical jokes. But one day he found a book which told him of this world.

Originally, Mxyztplk has designs on conquering the planet for himself, but soon settles for tormenting Superman whenever he gets the opportunity. His only weaknesses are that he cannot stand being ridiculed and if he says or spells his name backwards, he is involuntarily sent back to his home dimension for a minimum of 90 days. He first gets fooled when Superman asks what the word is and the imp says he can't believe Superman would have thought him stupid enough to say "Klptzyxm"--before realizing what he has just said and being transported home. Mxyztplk often looks for ways to counter the latter weakness, but he always proves gullible enough for Superman to trick him time and time again. In the Golden Age, saying "Klptzyxm" will not only send Mxyztplk back to the fifth dimension, but also anyone else who said it. To return to his/her home dimension, one has to say one's own name backwards.

Silver Age

Mxyztplk originally appeared as a small bald man in a purple suit, green bow tie, and purple derby hat. This was changed to a futuristic looking orange outfit with purple trim and white hair on the sides of his head in the mid-1950s, although the bowler hat remains adapted to the new color scheme. In Superman #131 (1959), the spelling of Mxyztplk's name changed (by some accounts through a mistake) to "Mxyzptlk".

It was explained in the Silver Age Superman comics that Mister Mxyzptlk could affect Superman because Superman is susceptible to magic, which was established as a major weakness for the superhero.

When a Mxyzptlk jaunt causes a special appearance by Superman to be cancelled and children, who had done nothing to Mxyzptlk, to be disappointed, Superman himself decides to turn the tables and visit the fifth dimension, making trouble for the imp, who is running for mayor. For example, when Mxyzptlk furnishes a huge supply of food for prospective voters, he says, "Eat up, folks, the food's on me!" Superman uses super-breath to blow the food all over the imp and then chortles to the voters, "Like he said, folks – the food is on him!" The imp tries to get the Man of Steel to say "Namrepus" (Superman backwards) repeatedly, but when he finally succeeds, it does not work and Superman remains in the fifth dimension. Mxyzptlk ultimately loses the election, and, his mission accomplished, Superman returns to Earth by whispering "Le-Lak" (his Kryptonian birth name Kal-El backwards).

Multiverse
After the establishment of DC Comics' Multiverse in the 1960s, it was later explained that the purple-suited Mxyztplk lives in the fifth dimension connected to Earth-Two, and the orange-costumed Mxyzptlk in the fifth dimension connected to Earth-One. The Earth-One version is also retconned into Superboy stories as the young red-haired Master Mxyzptlk, who bedevils Superboy during his youth in Smallville. He even appears as a deus ex machina to stop the Kryptonite Kid, who was killing a helpless Superboy, so that he could continue to bedevil Superboy and, later, Superman.

A 30th-century descendant of Mxyzptlk appeared in Adventure Comics #310 (July 1963) with similar abilities. Much crueler than his ancestor, this version kills most of the Legion of Super-Heroes until Superboy tricks him into falling victim to the same "Kltpzyxm" weakness, reversing the effects of his magic. However, in another story from Adventure Comics #355 (April 1967) featuring the 30th-century Adult Legion, the brother of the cruel Mxyzptlk teams up with a descendant of Lex Luthor to save the Legionnaires from the Legion of Super-Villains and join the Legion themselves.

Whatever Happened to the Man of Tomorrow?
Alan Moore offered a radically different interpretation of the character in the 1986 two-issue story Superman: Whatever Happened to the Man of Tomorrow?, a possible end of the adventures of the Earth-One Superman. Mister Mxyzptlk (appearing in darker colors and looking more sinister than in the past) explains that the problem with immortality is finding ways to spend the time. He spent his first 2,000 years without moving or breathing, the next 2,000 years doing only good deeds, and the following 2,000 years being the mischievous character that he is normally portrayed as. He has now decided to try being evil, and is responsible for all of the nightmarish events in the story (also musing that after 2,000 years of evil, he may spend the next 2,000 years feeling guilty). Before attacking Superman, he reveals his true form, which is described by Lois Lane as having "height, width, depth, and a couple of other things". He is killed when Superman sends him to the Phantom Zone at the same time that Mister Mxyzptlk begins an escape to the fifth dimension by saying his name backwards voluntarily, tearing him in two. Despite having recognized that his foe was too dangerous to be stopped any other way, remorse over the killing prompts Superman to drain himself of his powers using gold kryptonite.

Another final appearance of Mister Mxyzptlk was in the final issue of DC Comics Presents, which shows Jor-El's discovery of the Phantom Zone. By the end of the story, the Phantom Zone, the fifth dimension and the Bizarro World are all destroyed, and Mister Mxyzptlk, infilled by power endowed by a hideously disfigured wizard who was a denizen in the Phantom Zone, is transformed into an entity not even remotely human. He then throws the dead Argo City into Metropolis, littering it with tons of kryptonite and dead Kryptonians, and announces to an exasperated and horrified Superman that this was his last jest, that he will never be able to top it, and so says farewell to Superman.

Modern Mxyzptlk
Mxyzptlk made it through the Crisis on Infinite Earths relatively unchanged, although the unpleasant nature of his pranks and the psychological effects they have on others is played up more, such as when he animated the Daily Planet building heedless of the occupants inside who were being violently thrown around with its movements. He also began smoking cigars, symbolic of his newer, more antagonistic nature. His first appearance in this new continuity saw him initially adopting the guise of "Ben deRoy", an omnipotent mystery man resembling the Beyonder (the former name is an anagram of the latter), who was threatening the Marvel Universe around the same time. He resumed his more familiar appearance when he was confronted by Superman.

In his first Post-Crisis story, Mxyzptlk played the "Name Game" with Superman, with saying or writing his name backwards sending him home. However, in his next appearance, this has no effect; the "condition" that would send him back to the fifth dimension would be anything he stated it to be for the occasion, and the act itself would not banish him, but instead be Mxyzptlk abiding by his own terms. After his first encounter with Lex Luthor taught him how to lie, Mxyzptlk began rigging his contests with false or misleading aspects to make his challenges greater. Ultimately, the stories reverted to Mxyzptlk having to say his name backwards to get him to leave.

One of Mxyzptlk's most prominent storylines in the new continuity was the "Krisis of the Krimson Kryptonite" storyline, when he provided Lex Luthor with a sample of red kryptonite that took away Superman's powers so long as Luthor never revealed to Superman that Mxyzptlk was involved. Despite Superman's lack of powers, he still risked his life to battle Mammoth and the mad scientist Thaddeus Killgrave. Eventually, the spell was lifted when Luthor told "Clark Kent" where the red kryptonite had come from, believing that he would not be breaking Mxyzptlk's rule about not letting Superman know the truth if he told Kent and Kent told Superman (in a one-page aside in this story, Mister Mxyzptlk is implied to also be the Impossible Man, spending his off-time badgering the Fantastic Four of the Marvel Universe).

Many of Mxyzptlk's later stories have a postmodern feel to them, similar to Ambush Bug, as he comments on editorial decisions, clichés of the genre, etc. This was most obvious in Superman: The Man of Steel #75, a pastiche of Superman's death in Superman (vol. 2) #75, where Mxyzptlk creates a duplicate of Doomsday. The confrontation culminates with Mxyzptlk meeting the Supreme Being, who turns out to be Mike Carlin, the then-editor of the Superman titles, who promptly brings him back to life. Although Mxyzptlk does not appear in Grant Morrison's JLA, Morrison took advantage of certain similarities to tie Johnny Thunder's Thunderbolt and Aquaman's nemesis Qwsp to the fifth dimension, implying the dimension may be the origin for legends of djinn. This story also saw the first Post-Crisis appearance of Mxyzptlk's Earth-One girlfriend, Ms. Gsptlsnz (described as his "quinto-partner"; pronounced Giz-pit-lez-nez or "Gizbie" for short).

In 2001, DC published Bizarro Comics in which Mister Mxyzptlk fought an all-powerful entity named A who is conquering and wrecking dimensional worlds—including the 5th dimension—by use of toys and games. Mxyzptlk retains the services of a version of Bizarro who calls him Greg, and pads the story out by writing and drawing 27 off-beat stories using the DC superheroes, taking 160 pages. Bizarro is in two of them. Also of note is the depiction of Bahdnesian thunderbolts and Zook's species as native to the fifth dimension.

In Countdown to Final Crisis, the modern Mxyzptlk claims to have always felt the need for a "public" in the third dimension and that Superman was not his first victim.

Secret origin
In Young Justice #3, Peter David showed Mxyzptlk's origins as a serious-minded researcher, who travels through time, summoned by computer-based occultists. He takes the opportunity to conduct some scholarly studies. He chooses to examine a Halloween party in Happy Harbor, focusing on the results of aging a portion of the teens and causing some of the others to frantically dance out of control. What Mxyzptlk does not know was that Robin, Superboy, and Impulse were hired by the town's adults to chaperone the party. When the boys confront Mxyzptlk, they realize that this was not the same Mxyzptlk whom Superman had regularly faced; indeed, he appears to not have even assumed the name "Mxyzptlk" at this point, regarding it as sounding like something somebody randomly typed (which is, indeed, how the character chose his name in his first Post-Crisis appearance). Upon discovering the chaotic future that awaits him, Mxyzptlk declares that he would dedicate his life to learning and knowledge. However, those words led to a shift in time, creating an apocalyptic world everywhere but outside the building where the Halloween party is being held. This is because Mxyzptlk was not left to annoy Superman. To avoid this, Robin, Superboy, and Impulse realize that they need to instill Mxyzptlk with his trademark wacky sense of humor.

A Three Stooges film is uncovered and watched via an old projector. Mxyzptlk is entertained by the comedy in the film, and tries out a Stooge-style poke in the eye on the projectionist Mick Gurk (an homage to the name "McGurk", the name used by Mxyztplk for a statue he animated in his first appearance), finding the slapstick humor to his liking. He promises that, when it is time, he will hassle Superman as he is supposed to, in honor of Superboy, Impulse, Robin, and even Mick Gurk.

Time is restored to as how it should be...mostly. Outside the civic center is an unexpected Mxyzptlk theme park, the only change to the world.

However, it appears that Mxyzptlk has forgotten this incident as the years have passed. When confronted by Superboy later on, the imp declares that he had no knowledge of his adventure with Young Justice. Whether or not this is true, or Mxyzptlk was merely playing a trick on the Boy of Steel, is never revealed.

Improper use of power
In "Emperor Joker", a multi-issue story throughout the Superman titles, Mxyzptlk has his powers temporarily stolen by the Joker, who then remakes the Earth in his own image. The imp is unable to remember what to do to break the chain of events that daily culminates with Superman being dragged back to Arkham Asylum by Bizarro. Fortunately, Mxyzptlk is able to reveal the truth to Superman, who manages to find the power to break the cycle and defeat the Joker. As the Joker prepares to end existence, Superman realizes that, for all his power, the Joker still cannot erase Batman, as the Joker defines himself by his constant opposition to the Dark Knight, allowing Superman to shatter the Joker's control of reality. However, Mxyzptlk saves some of the Joker's creations and transfers them into the 'real' world, including Scorch, Gorgeous Gilly, the new Bizarro and "Ignition", a black-armored villain who first appeared in the "Emperor Joker" story, but was created by someone else (exactly who has never been revealed).

It has also been implied that Mxyzptlk sees himself as serving an important purpose, in teaching Superman not to take everything too seriously.

In Adventures of Superman #617 (2003), Mxyzptlk is reinvented as fraternal twins with an intense hatred for Superman. Amongst other things, they claim responsibility for the creation of the present-day Persuader. A year later, in Superman Secret Files and Origins 2004 (2004), he returns to his usual self following a fellow imp in the fifth dimension combining the twins with the classic Mxyzptlk, resulting in his normal form and personality.

Mxyzptlk formed a significant part of Greg Rucka's "Ruin" storyline in Adventures of Superman. His appearance here is similar to his Golden Age look, with the addition of a single lock of hair, resembling Superman's S-shaped forelock. This version of Mxyzptlk is less abrasive than he had been previously, and is portrayed as basically on Superman's side. The metafictional aspects of the character were also played up, as he visits the DC Comics offices in the real world, presented as fumetti.

At the same time, Mxyzptlk appeared in Superman/Batman #23, trying to prepare Batman and Superman for the upcoming Infinite Crisis. The incident features alternate universe versions of Superman, Batman, and Deathstroke the Terminator and implies much chaos that was not shown, such as the planet Mogo visiting Earth to reclaim an old land mass. At the end of this storyline, Mxyzptlk indicates he has erased the knowledge of Superman's identity from Lex Luthor's mind.

After the fallout of the events of Day of Vengeance (and, while not mentioned, the corruption of the fifth dimension as seen in JSA), the removal of magic from the Earth leaves Mxyzptlk nearly powerless, wandering the streets of Metropolis and unable to remember how to pronounce the inverse of his name to return him home. Superman attempts to help him, but the two are attacked by the villain Ruin. Ruin attempts to assassinate Superman with kryptonite-based weaponry, but Mxyzptlk pushes Superman out of the way, taking a kryptonite spear to the heart and vanishing. Right before he vanishes, he seems to whisper 'kltpzyxm'.

One Year Later
Action Comics Annual #10 states that Mister Mxyzptlk was last seen 190 days ago and that his name is pronounced "Mix-Yez-Pittle-Ick" (as it was in the 1960s Superman CBS-TV cartoon show, mentioned previously).

Countdown
Mister Mxyzptlk makes a one-page appearance in Countdown #31. On a walk in the fifth dimension with Gsptlsnz and his pet goldfish named Superman, he is grabbed by someone or something unknown, who then disappears with Mxy. It is later revealed in Countdown #23, Mxyzptlk was abducted by Superboy-Prime and imprisoned in the Source Wall. Prime has been apparently torturing the imp into helping him bring back his "perfect Earth", i.e. Earth Prime. Mxyzptlk mentions that he has been coming to Earth for centuries, and has been referred to by many names (Loki, Coyote, and Anansi). He is later sent back to his home by Annataz Arataz, the Earth-3 counterpart of Zatanna, whom Prime had also captured. Arriving in the fifth dimension, he proclaims to Gsptlsnz that he has escaped an encounter with "the Beast" (implying that the fifth dimension is aware of Superboy-Prime, who is referred to as a being of pure evil). Knowing that Superboy-Prime will kill every living soul in the fifth dimension to get revenge on him, Mxyzptlk proclaims that their dimension must be sealed off from outsiders immediately and that he can never return to Earth.

The New 52
In September 2011, The New 52 rebooted DC's continuity. In this new timeline, Mxyzptlk's history is revealed as a traveling wizard in the fifth dimension who entertained the King-Thing Brpxz of Zrfff. He did so by making 333 different three-dimensional worlds, and by challenging heroes in each world, with everyone being entertained by the one hero who could win the challenges, Superman. This led to Mxyzptlk becoming the king's favorite entertainer, and winning the love of the king's daughter, Gsptlnz. However, it also caused jealousy in the now-deposed original court magician, Vyndktvx. Vyndktvx eventually went mad and tried to kill Mxyzptlk, only to kill the king instead. The instant of the murder of the king, committed with the Multispear - a hyper-weapon - reflected in the three-dimensional universe Superman inhabits as a lifelong struggle with the five-dimensional being. Mxyzptlk and his beloved wife descended to the three-dimensional universe to aid Superman in his struggle; their mortal forms perished in due time, still in the same instant in the time of their home world. There, even as he was defeated in the three-dimensional universe, Vndyktvx was arrested and imprisoned for the murder. Mxyzptlk became king and lived happily with his wife, the beautiful princess-now-queen, only to grieve as she died giving birth to their children. And so, he became the sad king that one day, the jester Mxyzptlk would come to entertain, and who would be slain by Vndyktvx in an eternal cycle.

DC Rebirth
After the New 52 Superman died and Pre-52 Superman took his place by the time of the DC Rebirth reboot, a mysterious Clark Kent appeared claiming to be the real one. Despite everyone's hesitations and the previous event that outed Clark as Superman, the new Clark had the medical records to match, and when Superman questioned Clark with a telepathic probe, Clark presented a clear history of Clark Kent as a human being who was orphaned at three months old and subsequently adopted by the Kents. Pre-52 Lois investigates the new Clark more after getting her job back at the Daily Planet. Clark asks Lois out on a date which she accepts, but on the date, Lois finds that Clark rented the whole place out for the night and proposed to her, scaring her out of the date. He follows Lois to her secret home and finds out about her marriage to Superman and their son, Jonathan. The next day, after spotting Clark, Superman and Lois's house and Jonathan suddenly disappear. They track Clark down to his apartment, where he reveals himself to be the pre-52 Mister Mxyzptlk, who was absent from the New 52 universe because he was held captive by Mister Oz and used his powers to transform and brainwash himself into believing he was Clark Kent to avoid getting recaptured after escaping. His attacks on Superman are revenge for failing to notice he has been missing and he proceeds to make Lois forget about her own son. As even Lois forgets that Clark and Superman were the same person, Superman agrees to play Mister Mxyzptlk's game to try and win back the 'right' to see his son again, but although Mister Mxyzptlk attempts to change the rules and ensure his victory, Jonathan is able to fight through his Mister Mxyzptlk-created prison with the aid of unspecified spirits that are revealed to be the New 52 versions of Superman and Lois, culminating in the creation of a new timeline where the essence of the Post-Flashpoint Lois and Clark are fused with their Pre-Flashpoint selves, so that the history of both worlds can co-exist.

Powers and abilities
Mister Mxyzptlk possesses the ability to warp reality, which has been described alternatively as the product of fifth dimensional magic or advanced technology that appears to be magical to third dimensional beings. Attendant with his abilities is the fact that Mxyzptlk himself is not limited by physical laws: he needs no sustenance such as air or water, can exist in any environment, can teleport anywhere, and is not susceptible to physical harm. His only apparent vulnerability is that whenever he speaks his name backwards, he is shunted back to the fifth dimension, and all effects of his magic vanish. This also has occurred with an indirect application of that rule; on one occasion, Mxyzptlk was banished by a backward-played tape recording of his own voice saying his name.

However, such a banishment is just a temporary deterrent: after 90 days, Mxyzptlk can again visit the third dimension at will. His reality-warping powers exist in the fifth dimension, but he exerts less control compared to the third dimension, due to the presence of other imps with the same powers.

Though easily the most powerful of Superman's recurring enemies, the scope of Mxyzptlk's true potential is limited by his personality: his gullible nature makes it easy for Superman or other individuals to trick him into saying his name backwards, and he is overall a fun-loving prankster who prefers to use his power for childish mischief and light-hearted harassment rather than malicious destruction or torment. Thus, he is more of an annoyance than a true threat.

Other versions

Superman and Batman: World's Funnest
Superman and Batman: World's Funnest (2000) features Mxyzptlk and Bat-Mite in a battle of magic that kills almost the entire DC Universe and other worlds, at which point they laugh and agree to meet again "next Tuesday", thus revealing that the destruction is both temporary and also a regular source of entertainment for the magical pair.

Antimatter Universe
In The Brave and the Bold #11, Superman is confronted with Ultraman, his counterpart from the Antimatter Universe which most famously housed Qward; however, they are interrupted mid-battle by Mixyezpitellik, Mxyzptlk's own Antimatter counterpart. This counterpart does not reside in Qward, but is another inhabitant of the fifth dimension; he loathes being compared to Mxyzptlk, who he refers to as a 'madcap imp'. Just as Ultraman is in every way the opposite of Superman - uncontrolled, violent, and petulant - so is Mixyezpitellik from Mxyzptlk. He appears dressed in a neat suit and carries an umbrella and wears a large fedora rather than the clownish bowler, though it is still colored purple like that of his counterpart, and refers to himself as 'a vowelled Knight of Order', suggesting that the use of vowels in the fifth dimension denotes rank. Notably, Mixyezpitellik specifically states his powers are magic-based and thus limited to some degree, as indicated by him being changed by the very nature of the matter-based reality to become more imp-like to fit into its reality structure. Mixyezpitellik's relationship with Ultraman also mirrors that between Mxyzptlk and Superman; while to Superman, Mxyzptlk is merely a mischievous annoyance who rarely makes a great impact upon him, Ultraman finds himself terrified by Mixyezpitellik's power and is thus made to act as his agent.

Supergirl: Cosmic Adventures in the Eighth Grade
Mxyzptlk is the main villain in the miniseries. Here, he is disguised as the principal of Stanhope Boarding School, which Supergirl, Lena Luthor, and Belinda Zee attend. At the end of issue #5, Mxyzptlk and his henchmen (fellow teachers) reveal their true forms while laughing at the chaos they have spawned.

In the last issue of the series, it is revealed that Mxyzptlk was behind Supergirl's rocket landing in Metropolis, and almost all the catastrophes in the series, hoping to use her emotions to power a machine that would give him an unlimited amount of energy. It is even suggested that he might have been behind the destruction of Krypton in the first place, just to manipulate events to the current point. After being beaten by an omnipotent Supergirl, who is revealed to be the hand Krona saw, he retreats back to the fifth dimension, only to be banished to a two dimensional prison by his own henchmen, as punishment for "breaking the rules of the game".

Superman and Batman: Generations
Mister Mxyzptlk appears in Superman and Batman Generations. In 1959 he was pulled from the fifth dimension along with Bat-Mite by the Epsilon Eridanites to help find a hero that would help them defeat the Bortan Empire. Two of their representatives have found two worthy candidates in the form of Superman and Batman, and they wanted Mxyzptlk to test out Bat-Mite's hero Batman to find out his worthiness, while Bat-Mite tested out Mxyzptlk's hero Superman. Eventually Superman brought the whole contest over to Gotham City, having Bat-Mite's monster fight with Mxyzptlk's. Mxyzptlk decided at that point to create one giant tentacled monster to deal with both heroes. However, both Superman and Batman decided to make themselves look like they were totally defeated and destroyed by the monster so that the Epsilon Eridanites would end up choosing both Mxyzptlk and Bat-Mite as their heroes to take care of the Bortan threat, forever removing them from bothering either Superman or Batman ever again.

In other media

Television

Animation

 Mister Mxyzptlk appears in The New Adventures of Superman episode "Imp-Practical Joker", voiced by Gilbert Mack. This version's name uses the official DC Comics pronunciation.
 Mister Mxyzptlk appears in the Super Friends franchise, voiced by Frank Welker. This version's name is pronounced "miks-ill-plik" forwards and "kilp-ill-skim" backwards. Additionally, he enjoys tormenting all of the Super Friends even when Superman is absent. He appears in the Challenge of the Super Friends episode "The Rise and Fall of the Super Friends", The World's Greatest Super Friends episode "The Planet of Oz", and The Super Powers Team: Galactic Guardians episode "The Bizarro Super Powers Team" in addition to several appearances in Super Friends (1980) and Super Friends: The Legendary Super Powers Show.
 Mister Mxyzptlk appears in series set in the DC Animated Universe (DCAU):
 He first appears in the Batman: The Animated Series episode "Deep Freeze" as an animatronic toy with a design identical to the Bronze Age incarnation.
 Mxyzptlk appears in Superman: The Animated Series, voiced by Gilbert Gottfried. This version's design is based on the Golden Age incarnation and claims to have inspired Earth's legends of imps, genies, and leprechauns. Additionally, his name is pronounced "mix-yes-spit-lick" forwards and "kl-tp-zy-xm" backwards. In the episode "Mxyzpixilated", he torments Superman over the course of several months despite being repeatedly banished. Growing increasingly frustrated, he changes his banishment rule so that Superman has to make him say or spell his name backwards twice consecutively to banish him permanently. While Superman eventually succeeds in doing so, Mxyzptlk vows to find a loophole and return. In "Little Big Head Man", Mxyzptlk tricks Bizarro into leaving Bizarro World and attacking Superman, but incurs the wrath of a fifth dimensional council, who strip him of his powers, trap him in the three-dimensional world, and force him to perform good deeds for three months. After defeating Bizarro and learning of what happened, Superman convinces the imp to become Bizarro's assistant on Bizarro World.
 According to the commentary for "Mxyzpixilated", there were plans for Mxyzptlk to star in a Justice League episode, but neither screenwriter Paul Dini nor series developer Bruce Timm could figure out a story that would be suitable. Despite this, a cardboard cutout of Mxyzptlk appears in the episode "Secret Society" Pt. 1.
 Mister Mxyzptlk makes a minor appearance in the Batman: The Brave and the Bold episode "Battle of the Superheroes!", voiced by Kevin Michael Richardson. This version's name is pronounced "mix-ee-yez-pit-lik".
 Mister Mxyzptlk appears in Justice League Action, voiced again by Gilbert Gottfried. his name backwards was changed to "kl-tp-zyx-m" as opposed to "kl-tp-zy-xm" within the Superman animated series.

Live-action

 Mister Mxyzptlk appears in Superboy, portrayed by Michael J. Pollard.
 Mister Mxyzptlk appears in the Lois & Clark: The New Adventures of Superman episode "Twas the Night Before Mxymas", portrayed by Howie Mandel. This version's name is pronounced "mix-yez-pit-leck" and is said to have inspired legends of imps, genies and leprechauns as well as real historic events such as the fall of Rome. Additionally, he is more malevolent than other incarnations.
 A character inspired by Mister Mxyzptlk named Mikhail Mxyzptlk appears in the Smallville episode "Jinx", portrayed by Trent Ford. This version's name is pronounced "mix-ill-pit-ill-lick" and has the ability to manipulate targets via verbal commands and an ultrasonic frequency. Moreover, he is descended from a line of people from the "Kltpzyxm" family, who were said to control luck, but were forced to leave the Balkans and change their name. After coming to Smallville High School as a foreign exchange student sponsored by LuthorCorp, Mikhail starts an underground gambling ring until Clark Kent and Chloe Sullivan stumble onto him and broadcast a counter frequency to disrupt Mikhail's abilities. Despite this, Lex Luthor recruits Mikhail into his 33.1 Project with the promise of restoring his powers. In the comic book continuation Smallville Season 11, Luthor encounters Mikhail's uncle, the prime minister of Russia, who says he had Mikhail returned home without his powers.
 Mister Mxyzptlk appears in Supergirl, portrayed by Peter Gadiot in the second season and by Thomas Lennon in the fifth and sixth seasons. This version's name is pronounced "miss-is-pit-lick". In the episode "Mr. & Mrs. Mxyzptlk", he appears before Supergirl, revealing he has watched her from afar for some time and that he has fallen in love with her, but Mon-El attempts to banish him. Realizing he cannot directly make Supergirl marry him nor stop her from killing herself despite his powers, Mxyzptlk escapes and interferes with Supergirl's life in increasingly dangerous ways in an attempt to win her over. Pretending to accept his marriage proposal, Supergirl lures him to the Fortress of Solitude and triggers a nuclear meltdown. Mxyzptlk types in the kill code, but realizes too late that it was the Kryptonian translation of "Kltpzyxm" and banishes himself. In the episode "It's a Super Life", Mxyzptlk returns with a different form, having been ordered by unspecified higher powers to atone for his transgressions against Supergirl. Desiring the means to mend her friendship with Lena Luthor, Supergirl has him show her various realities wherein she revealed her identity to Lena, only to find Lena responds negatively and tragedy ensues in all of them. After getting trapped in a reality where Lena stole power from the fifth dimension, Mxyzptlk is depowered. However, he finds the Hat's namesake, restores his powers, and undoes the reality before sending Supergirl back to her reality. In the aforementioned sixth season, Mxyzptlk attempts to intervene in Supergirl's fight with Nyxly, but is absorbed by the latter.

Film
 Mister Mxyzptlk was considered to appear in Superman III, as written in an outline by Ilya Salkind, but the idea was scrapped. The Mxyzptlk portrayed in the outline varies from his good-humored comic counterpart, as he uses his abilities to do serious harm. Additionally, Dudley Moore was the top choice to play the role.
 Mister Mxyzptlk makes a cameo appearance in Teen Titans Go! vs. Teen Titans as one of Trigon's prisoners.

Video games
 Mister Mxyzptlk appears in Superman Returns, voiced by Dwight Shultz. He serves as a narrator for the minigames menu.
 Mister Mxyzptlk appears in DC Universe Online, voiced by Shanon Weaver.
 Mister Mxyzptlk appears in Scribblenauts Unmasked: A DC Comics Adventure.
 Mister Mxyzptlk appears as the central antagonist in Justice League: Cosmic Chaos, voiced by Dana Snyder. He declares himself mayor of Metropolis and caused mayhem in the city by creating a aquatic fish army and summoning Starro the Conqueror who controlled the Justice League (minus Superman, Batman, and Wonder Woman).

Lego
 Mister Mxyzptlk appears in Lego Batman 3: Beyond Gotham, with Gilbert Gottfried reprising his role for the first time since 1998.
 Mister Mxyzptlk appears in Lego DC Super-Villains, voiced again by Gilbert Gottfried.

Miscellaneous
 Mister Mxyzptlk appears in Superman & Bugs Bunny.
 Blaine L. Reininger's 1984 album Night Air contains a song called "A Café au Lait for Mr. Mxyzptlk".
 Mister Mxyzptlk appears in the Injustice: Gods Among Us prequel comic. Taking advantage of Jim Corrigan being incarcerated in Arkham Asylum, he usurps him as the Spectre, assumes his form, and joins Superman's Regime, claiming that he wants to bring order to the world. While fighting Trigon, Mxyzptlk's ruse and his personality having been corrupted is revealed. With Mxyzptlk's fight against Trigon tearing reality apart, Doctor Fate sacrifices himself to bring himself and the combatants into the "Void".

Reception
In 2009, Mister Mxyzptlk was ranked as IGN's 76th Greatest Comic Book Villain of All Time.

Cultural references
 Alan Moore's Supreme includes a version of Mxyzptlk called Szasz, the Sprite Supreme from the 19th dimension.
 In one issue of his own 1985 miniseries, Nightcrawler once mutters "Kltpzyxm" in a desperate attempt to return home from an interdimensional odyssey.
 In The Amazing Spider-Man #426, Peter Parker mumbles "Mxyzptlk" in his sleep. Similarly, his daughter from the MC2 Universe, Spider-Girl mutters "Kltpzyxm" as she is roused from her sleep.
 In the novel Super-Folks by Robert Mayer, the imp from the fifth dimension is named Pxyzsyzygy, foe of the novel's Superman analogue, David Brinkley. His face is revealed to be that of the smiley face.
 Brooklyn-based band Mixel Pixel credits Mxyzptlk as the source of their name.
 In a New Avengers comic, Spider-Man cracks a joke about how someone might "say the magic word, like 'Mxyzptlk'..."
 The third movement of American composer Michael Daugherty's Metropolis Symphony is a musical portrait of Mister Mxyzptlk.
 In Holy Musical B@man!, a 2012 Batman parody musical by StarKid Productions, Mister Mxyzptlk is mentioned and portrayed as one of Superman's lesser-known villains.
 In Robot Chicken, Superman disguises himself as a coffee shop worker and mispronounces Mxyzptlk's name backwards, causing Mxyzptlk, voiced by Seth Green, to correct him, but still get sent back to his home dimension.
 In Family Guy, Mayor Adam West was a contestant on Jeopardy! and during Final Jeopardy!, he wrote "Kebert Xela", which is the name of host Alex Trebek spelled backwards for his response. Trebek says it and it causes him to disappear just like Mxyzptlk and West says "only saying his name backwards can send him back to the fifth dimension where he belongs".
 In The Big Bang Theory episode "The Spoiler Alert Segmentation", Sheldon picks up a Mister Mxyzptlk action figure referring that it belonged to Leonard when he's clearing out his belongings after moving in briefly with Penny to which Amy erroneously refers to as a "children's toy".
 Mister Ogg in the 1987–1996 animated Teenage Mutant Ninja Turtles series is based on Mister Mxyzptlk.
 In a 1997 comic The Imp and I, Mickey Mouse confronts the Imp from the 11th Dimension. The magical troublemaker can only be banished from Mickey's world by tricking the Imp to spell a charm used by it backwards.
 A parody of the character called Mr. Skibumpers appears in the SuperMansion special "War on Christmas". However, his weakness is if he removes his hat, he will turn into a wooden doll, as opposed to saying his name backward and being sent back to his home dimension.

Pronunciation
Due to the phonetic difficulties in pronouncing a name spelled without vowels such as Mxyzptlk, it has been pronounced in various ways by various sources over the past four decades. On the 1967 Filmation CBS Superman animated series, it was pronounced as Mix-yez-PITTLE-ik; sources indicate that was the official DC Comics version of the time, furnished to the show's writers through DC Comics editor/writer E. Nelson Bridwell. During the 1980s, on the Super Friends cartoon, produced by Hanna-Barbera, it was approximated as Mix-ill-plick. Miks-yez-pit-lik is actually a general translation and other variations have included Mix-yez-PIT-lek, Mix-yez-PIT-ul-ick, and Mix-yez-pittle-ik. To further complicate matters, Mxyzptlk says himself in the 1990s animated series of Superman, that his name is pronounced the same as saying the words "mix, yes, spit, lick", even transforming himself into the appropriate illustrations for the words. Clark had pronounced his name as Mix-ill-plick before Mxyzptlk popped out of the comic and proceeded to correct him. In his appearance in the Superman Returns video game, Mxyzptlk proudly refers to himself as "the one and only Mr. Mix-yiz-SPIT-Lik!, straight from the fifth dimension!" Miks-il-piti-lik (with the is pronounced only lightly) was used on Smallville, all while the original spelling of his name was pronounced mix-pit-tulk. This has created great confusion and even debate as to how his name is actually to be spoken.

In Action Comics Annual #10 (2007), "Superman's Top 10 Most Wanted" describes Mister Mxyzptlk and provides the pronunciation as Mix-yez-pittle-ik, exactly like the 1967 animated series. So, phonetically, the pronunciation backwards would be "Kell-tipp-ZEY-skim". Confusingly, the 1967 animated series used the backwards pronunciation "Kulp-ti-mix-im". It is fair to say that producers were free to interpret the name any way they wanted, just as they routinely changed other elements of comic lore to suit their various series.

See also
 Bat-Mite
 Joe Btfsplk
 List of Superman enemies
 Rumpelstiltskin
 Q
 Trickster god

References

External links
 Mr. Mxyzptlk at Comic Vine

DC Comics aliens
Golden Age supervillains
DC Comics extraterrestrial supervillains
DC Comics supervillains
DC Comics male supervillains
DC Comics deities
DC Comics characters who can teleport 
DC Comics characters who use magic
Fictional characters who can manipulate reality
Fictional higher-dimensional characters
Fictional tricksters
Characters created by Jerry Siegel
Characters created by Joe Shuster
Comics characters introduced in 1944
Fictional pranksters